The 2017 Mençuna Cup was a professional tennis tournament played on outdoor hard courts. It was the first edition of the tournament and was part of the 2017 ITF Women's Circuit. It took place in Artvin, Turkey, on 21–27 August 2017.

Singles main draw entrants

Seeds 

 1 Rankings as of 14 August 2017.

Other entrants 
The following players received a wildcard into the singles main draw:
  Başak Akbaş
  Berfu Cengiz
  İpek Öz
  Melis Sezer

The following player received entry using a protected ranking:
  Vitalia Diatchenko

The following players received entry from the qualifying draw:
  Gozal Ainitdinova
  Akgul Amanmuradova
  Ekaterine Gorgodze
  Ekaterina Kazionova

Champions

Singles

 Valeria Savinykh def.  Ayla Aksu, 3–6, 7–6(12–10), 7–6(7–5)

Doubles
 
 Gabriela Cé /  Ankita Raina def.  Elitsa Kostova /  Yana Sizikova, 6–2, 6–3

External links 
 2017 Mençuna Cup at ITFtennis.com

2017 ITF Women's Circuit
2017 in Turkish tennis
2017
2017 in Turkish women's sport